The Khojaly Massacre Memorial in Khatai raion, Baku, and the first public memorial in Azerbaijan dedicated to victims of the Khojaly Massacre.

Construction and unveiling
The memorial was built in 2008, funded by the local government under the impetus of president Ilham Aliyev.

Design
The memorial consists of granite boulders lying within a gravel bed, while figure made from bronze. Height of the memorial altogether is 8.6 m. The monument depicts a mother with a dead child in her arms, which she presses to the heart. During construction of the memorial, sculptors were also used photographs taken Azerbaijani journalist Chingiz Mustafayev.

References

Monuments and memorials in Baku
Khojaly Massacre memorials
Cultural infrastructure completed in 2008